Romain Buros (born 31 July 1997) is a French rugby union player, who plays mainly as a full-back for Union Bordeaux Bègles.

Biography 
Romain Buros started playing rugby for his hometown club Aire-sur-l'Adour, before joining Pau academy. After playing his first professional games with Pau, he joined the Bordeaux Bègles in 2018, where he really became a regular starter in Top 14.

He was first called to the France national team by Fabien Galthié on the 18 October 2021, for the autumn internationals.

References

External links

1997 births
Sportspeople from Landes (department)
Living people
French rugby union players
Union Bordeaux Bègles players
Rugby union fullbacks
Section Paloise players